Symon Vuwa Kaunda is a Malawian Politician and the former Minister of Environment Tourism and Wildlife in the Republic of Malawi. He has also previously served the ruling Democratic Progressive Party Government as Minister of Lands, Housing and Urban Development, Minister of Youth Development and Welfare, Minister of Information and Civic Education, and Deputy Minister of Home Affairs in the Republic of Malawi</ref> Malawi.

He was a member of the Pan-African Parliament from Malawi and a member of the National Assembly of Malawi as part of the ruling Democratic Progressive Party. Kaunda held various ministerial positions in the former DPP led government.

References

Year of birth missing (living people)
Living people
Members of the National Assembly (Malawi)
Members of the Pan-African Parliament from Malawi
Democratic Progressive Party (Malawi) politicians